Rudy Galli (born 21 September 1983) is an Italian snowboarder. He competed in the men's parallel giant slalom event at the 2006 Winter Olympics.

References

External links
 

1983 births
Living people
Italian male snowboarders
Olympic snowboarders of Italy
Snowboarders at the 2006 Winter Olympics
Sportspeople from the Province of Sondrio